Zhang Hongwei (born April 26, 1975) is a Chinese pole vaulter. His personal best jump is 5.63 metres, achieved in May 2000 in Deyang.

He won the gold medal at the 2000 Asian Championships and the silver medal at the 2005 Asian Championships.

Achievements

References

1975 births
Living people
Chinese male pole vaulters